The Šar Mountains (Serbian and Macedonian: Шар Планина,  Šar Planina; colloquially also Шара,  Šara) or Sharr Mountains, is a mountain range extending from southern Kosovo to northwestern North Macedonia. The sections in Kosovo, and in Šar Mountains National Park (North Macedonia) are national parks.

Etymology 
In antiquity, the mountains were known as Scardus, Scodrus, or Scordus (το Σκάρδον ὂρος in Polybius and Ptolemy). which evolved into the modern name - "Sharr/Šar" - through sound development characteristic to the Albanian language from “Scardus”.
. In the early 16th century, it was recorded that the mountain was called Catena Mundi (Latin for "the chains of the world").

Sometimes the range is called Carska Planina ("Tsar's Mountain"), as a reference to the capitals (Prizren and Skopje), courts (Nerodimlje, Pauni, Svrčin, etc.) and monasteries (monastery of the Holy Archangels) of the Serbian Empire located in the region. 
In the medieval period, Serbs called the mountain Mlečni, because of the major milk production on the mountain and the vast herds of cattle, goats and sheep. In the golden bull issued by Emperor Dušan on 20 September 1349, he says: "I also bequest all of mine estates and areas around the Mlečni Mountain ("Milk Mountain"), the Durlev estates and all the metochions and all the wealth and treasure of that region". The bull is kept in the Dubrovnik Archive.

Borders 
The mountain borders extend from the city of Prizren, following the two rivers of the Prizren Lumbardhi and the Lepenac. In the east it passes by the town of Kaçanik through the Kaçanik Gorge and into North Macedonia via the Polog valley. The border passes near the Vardar spring called Vrutok and enters near the valley of Mavrovo. There the Radika river separates the mountain massif from the higher Mount Korab. After that, the border is mounting, reaching the point of junction of three state borders: Kosovo, North Macedonia and Albania. The border now follows the road to the small, mountainous, town of Restelica, the rivers of Globocica, Plava and the White Drin and finally reaches the city of Prizren.

Geographical characteristics 

The Šar Mountains have a total area of 1600 km². 56,25% of that area is in North Macedonia, 43.12% in Kosovo, and 0,63% in Albania. There are three plains Sirinić, Vraca and Rudoka.

The mountain massif was formed in the Tertiary Period. The peaks are covered with ice and snow.

It includes several high peaks:
 Titov Vrv
 Mal Turčin
 Bakardan
 Borislavec
 Velika Rudoka
 Bistra - east summit (Peskovi)
 Bistra - west summit
 Small Rudoka
 Džini Beg
 Lake Peak
 Karabunar
 White Lake Peak
 Maja e zezë
 Big Vraca
 Guzhbaba
 Isa Aga
 Black Peak
 Kobilica
 Piribeg
 Ljuboten
 Maja Livadh
 Zallina
 Small Vraca 
 Kara Nikolla 
 Maja Koritnik
 Tumba Peak
 Gemitash 
 Kalabak 
 Crnkamenska Kula 
 Šerupa tri-point 

The Šar Mountains extend to Mount Korab in the southwest, and pass into northeastern Albania with very small part (0.63% of the entire length).

The Šar Mountains are the largest compact area covered with pastures on the European continent. The dog breed Šarplaninac comes from this area.

The snowy peaks of the Šar Mountains are depicted on the coat of arms of the city of Skopje, which in turn is incorporated in the city's flag.

History 
The remains of the Široko complex are located near Mušutište. The complex originates from the period between the 10th and the 7th century BC, but also has medieval remnants. In Roman period, the mountain was a tripoint between the provinces of Dalmatia, Moesia and Macedonia. The route of an ancient road crossed the Scardus from 169 BC. The road was later named Velji ("Great") or Prizren road. Lisinski road was built. Remnants of the fort on the Kradište hill, near Prizren, dates from the 2nd to the 6th century and testifies the change of civilizations in this region: it started in the pre-Roman period, then became a Roman town and later a Byzantine one. Locality of Ravna Gora, predating the 6th century, where Slavs later cremated their dead, is situated in the area. Medieval military complex of Petrič Fortress, which consists of two fortresses, Little Petrič and Great Petrič, is also preserved. Remains of the Višegrad Fort, older part of the Prizren Fortress, are located in the gorge of the Bistrica river. When King Milutin donated lands to the Our Lady of Ljeviš church, he also donated the Višegrad Fort to serve as an Prizren's defence outpost. Emperor Dušan later expanded the fort to the river and built his endowment, the Monastery of the Holy Archangels.

There are 45 Serbian Orthodox monasteries on the slopes of the mountain, dating from the 12th to the 16th century. Additional 32 monasteries were damaged or demolished during the NATO bombing of Serbia in 1999 and in the later years. Church of the Dormition of the Mother of God in the village of Gotovuša in Sirinićka Župa was built in 16th century. It was destroyed later and rebuilt in the second half of the 19th century. During the works in churchyard in the 2010s a floor mosaic was discovered from the much older church from the Byzantine period.

Šar Mountains in Kosovo 

The Šar Mountains are located in the south and south-east of Kosovo, where 43.12% of the range is located. Many alpine and glacial mountain lakes are found on the Kosovar part of the Šar Mountains, especially south of the village of Dragaš, the area of Shutman and the region north of Vraca.

The mountain range in Kosovo is divided into three main zones:The zone of Ljuboten and Brezovica, the central zone of Prizren and the zone of Opoja and Gora.

The mountains border the Kosovo Plain to the north-east and the Metohia Valley in the northwest. Kosovo consists of the most eastern tip and the most northern part of the mountain ridge. The Ljuboten peak and the mountain of Skopska Crna Gora create the Kačanik Gorge in Kosovo. The Šar Mountains are split from the Nerodimka Mountain by the Sirinić Valley. The Šar National Park is located in Kosovo. Villages and towns that are found near the mountain are:

 Prizren largest city located at the foot of the mountains.
 Kaçanik
 Dragaš
 Brezovica
 Štrpce

Lakes in the Kosovo part of the Šar Mountains are:

 Big Jažinačko Lake
 Small Jažinačko Lake
 Šutmansko Lake
 Lower Defsko Lake
 Štrbačko Lake
 Black Vir Lake
 Donji Vir Lake
 Blateško Lake
 Upper Defsko Lake
 Dinivodno Lake

In total, there are 70 glacial lakes on Šara.

Kosovo national park

History 

Geography 
The park occupies the northwest sections of the mountain's main massif, including the highest peak, Bistra, an spreads over the sections of Prevalac, Ošljak, Ostrovica and Kodža Balkan. The park encompasses several different types of topographic relief: glacial (cirques, moraines and glacial lakes), periglacial (snow cirques, sliding blocks, "tundra mosaic" type of micro-shapes in the deposits of silt), karstic and fluvial. There are numerous rivers, springs, creeks, bogs and lakes.

Plant life 
In total, there are 1,800 plant species. The mountain is inhabited by 175 strictly protected plant species, 247 Balkan endemites and 18 plants which can be found only on Šara. The park includes the endemic relict Macedonian Pine and white-bark pine, as well as the mugo pine and Alpine rose. Other perennial plants include King Alexander's yarrow (Achillea alexandri-regis), Nikolić's silene (Heliosperma nikolicii), Bornmuellera dieckii, Šar carnation (Dianthus scardicus Wettst.), Doerfler's cinquefoils and Macedonian meadow saffron (Colhicum macedonicum). One of the relic species is Natalie's ramonda. It went extinct from the most of Europe during the last ice age and today grows as an endemic species in several gorges in Serbia, North Macedonia and Greece. It has been chosen as the Serbian symbol for the Armistice Day.

Animal life 
Rusenica locality on the mountain has been in the first level of protection, as the strict reserve of nature, since 1955. It is one of the rare habitats of Balkan lynx, the largest European cat. It is estimated that on the entire Balkans there are no more than 100 specimens. European pond turtle and Hermann's tortoise, only two European species of freshwater turtles, live on the mountain. There are 147 butterfly species (excluding moths), 45 amphibians and reptilians and 37 mammalian species. Other animals include bear, chamois, wolf, roe deer, wild boar and other species including many bird species. The national park contains 720 chamois while the Opoja and Gora region contains 600 chamois. The National Park is administrated by the Ministry of Environment and Spatial Planning (MESP) of Kosovo.

See also 
 List of mountains in Albania
 List of mountains in Kosovo
 List of mountains in North Macedonia

Annotations

References

External links 
 
 Šar planina (in Serbian)

 
Geography of Southeastern Europe
Mountain ranges of Albania
Mountain ranges of Kosovo
Mountain ranges of North Macedonia
Protected areas established in 1986
Mountain ranges of Europe
Mountains associated with Byzantine monasticism